The Canton of Bastia-5, also known as Lupino or Lupinu, is a former canton of the arrondissement of Bastia, in the department of Haute-Corse, Corsica France. It had 8,144 inhabitants (2012). It was disbanded following the French canton reorganisation which came into effect in March 2015. It comprised part of the commune of Bastia.

References

Bastia-5
Canton 5
2015 disestablishments in France
States and territories disestablished in 2015